Brotherhood (subtitled The Definitive Singles Collection) is a compilation album by English electronic dance music duo The Chemical Brothers, released on 1 September 2008. It is the second compilation spanning the band's greatest hits, after 2003's Singles 93–03. The first disc features thirteen hit singles and two new tracks, "Midnight Madness" and "Keep My Composure" (featuring a guest appearance of the rap group Spank Rock)—while the second CD contains all ten parts of The Chemical Brothers' "Electronic Battle Weapon" series of special mixes, which the duo have been recording since 1996.

The single was promoted by user-generated content through Google Earth. Fans were challenged to produce and upload a short film, from 2 to 20 seconds long, or a photograph based on the song that would become part of its music video, to be edited by producers Nexus.

Singles 

"Electronic Battle Weapon 10" was released on 11 June 2008, followed by "Midnight Madness" on 4 August 2008, with the latter reaching number 80 on the UK Singles Chart.

Track listing

Disc one 
All tracks were produced by The Chemical Brothers.

Disc two 
All tracks were written and produced by The Chemical Brothers.

Charts

Certifications

References

External links
 

The Chemical Brothers albums
2008 greatest hits albums
Virgin Records compilation albums
2008 remix albums
Virgin Records remix albums